Mawat may refer to:

 Mawat, Iraq, a town in Iraqi Kurdistan
 Rumah Mawat, a settlement in Sarawak